"The Chokin' Kind" is a 1967 song written by Nashville songwriter Harlan Howard. Country music artist Waylon Jennings recorded the original version and released it as a single in 1967. It peaked at number eight on the US Hot Country Singles chart. Jennings featured the track on his 1967 album Hangin' On. R&B artist Joe Simon covered the song in 1969 and country artist Willie Nelson covered it in 2023.

Covers

Joe Simon

The song was recorded by Joe Simon in 1969 and was his first number one on the US R&B chart, where it stayed for three weeks. "The Chokin' Kind" was also Joe Simon's first top twenty entry on the pop singles chart. 
Simon received the 1970 Grammy Award for Best R&B Vocal Performance, Male for this song.

Charts

Willie Nelson
Willie Nelson included a cover on his 2023 album of Harlan Howard songs I Don't Know a Thing About Love.

References

1969 singles
Songs written by Harlan Howard
1967 songs
Waylon Jennings songs
Willie Nelson songs
Joe Simon (musician) songs